Blockers is a 2018 American sex comedy film directed by Kay Cannon in her directorial debut and written by Brian and Jim Kehoe, and starring John Cena, Leslie Mann, and Ike Barinholtz with supporting roles by Kathryn Newton, Geraldine Viswanathan, Gideon Adlon, Graham Phillips, Miles Robbins, Jimmy Bellinger, Colton Dunn, Sarayu Blue, Gary Cole, Gina Gershon, June Diane Raphael, and Hannibal Buress. It tells the story of a trio of parents who try to stop their respective daughters from losing their virginity on prom night. The title of the film is a reference to the act of "cockblocking", with marketing materials displaying a rooster (also known as a cock) above the title.

The film premiered at South by Southwest on March 10, 2018, and was theatrically released in the United States on April 6, 2018, by Universal Pictures. It grossed $94 million worldwide and received generally positive reviews from critics, with praise for its "humor and performances", as well as for "intelligence and empathy" not often found in the genre.

Plot
Single mother Lisa Decker drops off her young daughter, Julie, for her first day of kindergarten. She watches on as Julie is befriended by two other girls, Kayla and Sam. Kayla's father Mitchell and Sam's father Hunter introduce themselves and become close friends after seeing the bond between their children.

Twelve years later, Julie shares with Kayla and Sam that she plans to lose her virginity to her boyfriend Austin at prom. Kayla pledges to do so as well, though on a casual basis with her lab partner, Connor. Sam, a closeted lesbian unsure about her feelings, also joins the pact and arranges to attend the prom with the harmless Chad.

Lisa throws a pre-party for the parents and kids. The girls then head to the prom, texting each other about their sex pact. The three parents hear Julie's laptop and intercept the messages. Hunter deciphers their emoji codes and uncovers their plan. Lisa and Mitchell rush to stop their daughters; Hunter tries to dissuade them from interfering and shares his intuition that Sam is gay, but upon seeing her force herself to kiss Chad, he joins them to stop her from doing something she doesn't want to do.

Having been told that the after-party would be at Austin's house, the parents go there but find only Austin's parents Ron and Cathy engaging in sex games. Ron reveals that the after-party is at a lake house but refuses to give the address. The trio realizes that Mitchell's wife Marcie may have it and return to his house. They retrieve the address against Marcie's wishes, who supports their daughter's right to privacy, but are unable to catch them when the cops show up.

As the group struggles to track down their daughters, it becomes clear that each parent has their own motivation: Mitchell is in denial over his daughter growing up, Hunter feels guilty for neglecting Sam during his bitter separation from her mother, who cheated on him, and Lisa is struggling to let go of her only child and is offended by Julie's plans to go to distant UCLA with Austin rather than a closer college she wanted; this point is proven when an angry Julie reveals she's only going to UCLA to get away from Lisa's clingyness.

Knowing that Austin and Ron have been texting, the parents return to Ron's house, intending to grab his phone. After barging in on the couple playing a blindfold sex game, Hunter is forced to go along with it as Mitchell grabs the phone, which reveals that the girls are at a hotel. There a drunk Sam goes to bed with Chad but decides she does not want to have sex. Kayla and Connor go off together, but she also changes her mind and they limit their intimacy to Connor performing oral sex on Kayla.

Mitch finds Kayla with Connor and throws him against the wall, infuriating Kayla. Mitch confesses his struggles, his good intentions ultimately making amends with Kayla. Hunter finds Sam and they also share a tender moment, where he reveals that a good night was the best he could give her in return for his neglect. Sam comes out to her father, who is deeply moved at being the first person she told. Lisa sneaks into Julie and Austin's room and, realizing how much they clearly love each other, leaves unnoticed. Sam comes out to Julie and Kayla, who embrace her and affirm their lifelong friendships. They leave Sam with her crush Angelica who shares a romantic kiss with her. Mitch, Lisa and Hunter acknowledge their own friendships have been strengthened and drink to their daughters' futures.

Three months later, Sam, Kayla, Julie and Connor ready to drive to California. As they leave, Lisa starts receiving the girls' group text, filled with plans to use drugs and have unprotected sex. The three parents run for the car only for the girls to text that it was a prank, and a final "I love you" to them.

In a post-credits scene, Kayla walks in on Mitchell and Marcie playing a version of Austin's parents' blindfold sex game and the three scream in shock.

Cast

 Leslie Mann as Lisa Decker, Julie's single mother.
 John Cena as Mitchell Mannes, Kayla's headstrong father.
 Ike Barinholtz as Hunter Lockwood, Sam's absentee divorced father.
 Kathryn Newton as Julie Decker, Lisa's daughter.
 Anniston Almond as 6-year-old Julie
 Audrey Casson as 12-year-old Julie
 Geraldine Viswanathan as Kayla Mannes, Mitchell and Marcie's daughter.
 Noor Anna Maher as 6-year-old Kayla
 Madeline Paris Erwin as 12-year-old Kayla
 Gideon Adlon as Sam Lockwood, Hunter's daughter.
 Hannah Goergen as 6-year-old Sam
 Aburey Michele Katz as 12-year-old Sam
 Ramona Young as Angelica, Sam's crush.
 Graham Phillips as Austin, Julie's boyfriend.
 Miles Robbins as Connor Aldrich, Kayla's prom date.
 Jimmy Bellinger as Chad, Sam's fedora-wearing prom date.
 Colton Dunn as Rudy, an overeager limo driver.
 Sarayu Blue as Marcie Mannes, Mitchell's wife and Kayla's mother.
 Gary Cole as Ron, Cathy's husband and Austin's father.
 Gina Gershon as Cathy, Ron's wife and Austin's mother.
 June Diane Raphael as Brenda Lockwood, Sam's mother and Hunter's ex-wife.
 Hannibal Buress as Frank, Brenda's husband and Sam's stepfather.
 Andrew Lopez as Jake Donahue
 Jake Picking as Kyler
 T.C. Carter as Jayden

Production
Principal photography on the film began on May 2, 2017, in Atlanta, Georgia. During filming, Ike Barinholtz suffered a neck injury while performing a falling stunt.

Release
Blockers was released by Universal Pictures on April 6, 2018. The film was originally produced under the name The Pact, referring to the girls' agreement to lose their virginity.

Reception

Box office
Blockers grossed $60.3 million in the United States and Canada, and $33.7 million in other territories, for a worldwide total of $94 million, against a production budget of $21 million.

In the United States and Canada, Blockers was released alongside A Quiet Place, Chappaquiddick and The Miracle Season, and was projected to gross $16–20 million from 3,379 theaters in its opening weekend. The film made $7.8 million on its first day (including $1.5 million from Thursday night previews). It went on to debut to $20.6 million, finishing third, behind A Quiet Place ($50 million) and Ready Player One ($25.1 million). In its second weekend the film dropped 47.6% to $10.8 million, finishing fourth.

Critical response
The website's critical consensus reads, "Blockers puts a gender-swapped spin on the teen sex comedy – one elevated by strong performances, a smartly funny script, and a surprisingly enlightened perspective." On Metacritic, the film has a weighted average score of 69 out of 100, based on 46 critics, indicating "generally favorable reviews." Audiences polled by CinemaScore gave the film an average grade of "B" on an A+ to F scale, while PostTrak reported filmgoers gave it a 76% overall positive score.

Brian Lowry of CNN.com found that "the movie gets by on sheer energy" and praised director Kay Cannon for creating "some truly blue sequences and sight gags that yield explosive laughs [and] largely compensate for the arid patches, as do the warm/fuzzy exchanges, which smartly play off the idea of raising your children and then trusting them enough to let go."
Describing Blockers as "absurd and funny", Amy Nicholson of Uproxx favorably compared screenwriters Brian and Jim Kehoe to American Pie directors Chris and Paul Weitz as "brothers trying to do right by the sexual politics of the time."
Joshua Rothkopf of Time Out gave the film four out of five stars, calling it "a wonderfully crude film... in which the overall vibe is sweet" and a "hilarious, parents'-eye view of teenage sexuality."
Adam Graham of The Detroit News called the film "highly dubious and not very funny," and stated that the film "awkwardly tries to balance gross-out gags with tender, warm-and-fuzzy moments. It's a tough trick to pull off, and Blockers gets stuffed at every turn."
David Sims of The Atlantic stated that the film "works because of the time it invests in its teenaged characters. Each is a delight, particularly the supremely chilled-out Kayla (who decides to lose her virginity largely on a whim) and the more introverted Sam (who knows she’s gay but hasn’t quite figured out how to tell her friends and family)."
Ann Hornaday from The Washington Post wrote: "The underlying values of "Blockers" are refreshingly healthy and affirming, proclaimed not only by Kayla's pointedly levelheaded mom (Sarayu Blue)—in a fiery speech about the double standards and the dubious politics of policing female sexuality—but by the girls themselves."

Richard Roeper of the Chicago Sun-Times gave the film two out of four stars, giving credit to the cast but saying they were not given much to do: "Despite the best efforts of reliable comedic veterans Leslie Mann and Ike Barinholtz, not to mention a game and always likable John Cena...Blockers becomes less interesting and less funny as the onscreen hijinks grow more outlandish and stupid and demeaning and crotch-oriented."
Brian Tallerico of RogerEbert.com gave the film two-and-a-half stars, saying that it is "the kind of comedy one could stumble upon late at night on HBO and thoroughly enjoy, but it strains under the weight of its tonal inconsistencies in a movie theater."

Accolades
In 2019, the film was nominated for a GLAAD Media Award for Outstanding Film – Wide Release. Blockers was among 20 of 2018's 100 highest-grossing films awarded The ReFrame Stamp for recognition in "standout, gender-balanced" films, and also one out of four Stamp recipients with a female director.

Music
The single "Love Myself" by Hailee Steinfeld appears twice in the film. In her review of Blockers, Insider writer Kim Renfro wrote, "The anthem carried throughout the movie, Hailee Steinfeld's 'Love Myself,' drives the message home: 'I love me, gonna love myself, no I don't need anybody else.'"

References

External links
 
 

2018 films
2018 comedy films
2018 directorial debut films
2018 LGBT-related films
2010s buddy comedy films
2010s coming-of-age comedy films
2010s female buddy films
2010s sex comedy films
2010s teen comedy films
American buddy comedy films
American coming-of-age comedy films
American female buddy films
American sex comedy films
American teen comedy films
American teen LGBT-related films
DMG Entertainment films
2010s English-language films
Films about families
Films about proms
Films about virginity
Films produced by Seth Rogen
Films set in 2006
Films set in 2018
Films set in Chicago
Films shot in Atlanta
Lesbian-related films
LGBT-related buddy films
LGBT-related coming-of-age films
LGBT-related sex comedy films
Juvenile sexuality in films
Point Grey Pictures films
Teen buddy films
Teen sex comedy films
Universal Pictures films
Films produced by Evan Goldberg
2010s American films